Dorothy Morrison (January 3, 1919 – October 18, 2017), later taking the married name Dorothy Morrison Green, was an American stage and screen actress who as a child actress appeared in a few of the Hal Roach created Our Gang short subject films during the silent era. Her older brother, Ernie Morrison (billed as Sunshine Sammy), also acted in this film series.

References

External links
 
 Dorothy Morrison at the American Film Institute
 

1919 births
2017 deaths
20th-century American actresses
African-American actresses
American child actresses
American stage actresses
American film actresses
American silent film actresses
20th-century African-American women
20th-century African-American people
21st-century African-American people
21st-century African-American women
Actresses from Los Angeles